Leo John Donnellan (born 19 Jan 1965) is an Irish former footballer who played professionally for Fulham as a midfielder. He was also capped by the Republic of Ireland Under 18 and Republic of Ireland Under 21 sides in 1983 and 1985.

Personal life
Donnellan is the father of Leo Donnellan Jr and Shaun Donnellan, who currently play for Dagenham & Redbridge and the brother of fellow professional footballer Gary Donnellan.

References

1965 births
Living people
Footballers from Willesden
Republic of Ireland association footballers
Republic of Ireland youth international footballers
Association football midfielders
English Football League players
Chelsea F.C. players
Leyton Orient F.C. players
Fulham F.C. players
Farnborough F.C. players
Wealdstone F.C. players
Hendon F.C. players